The 2021 Russian Women's Football Championship was the 30th season of the Russian women's football top-level league. CSKA Moscow were the defending champion.

Teams

League table

Results

Top scorers

References

External links
Russian Championship standings

2021
Russia
Russia
Women
Women